Christy Nicole Turlington Burns (born January 2, 1969) is an American model and humanitarian. She represented Calvin Klein's Eternity campaign in 1989 and again in 2014, and also represents Maybelline. Turlington was named one of Glamours Women of the Year in 2013, and, in 2014, was included on the annual Time 100 list of the most influential people in the world. Turlington initially attracted fame in the late 1980s and early 1990s as a supermodel. Grace Coddington, the long-time creative director of American Vogue magazine, has described Turlington as "the most beautiful woman in the world."

In 2010, Turlington founded Every Mother Counts, a non-profit 501(c)(3) organization devoted to making pregnancy and childbirth safe for every mother. Every Mother Counts informs, engages, and mobilizes new audiences to take action and raise funds that support maternal health programs around the world. It was founded after the completion of Turlington's documentary, No Woman, No Cry, a film about pregnant women and their caregivers in Tanzania, Bangladesh, Guatemala, and the United States. In 2013, Turlington directed the documentary film Every Mile, Every Mother, which explores Every Mother Counts' participation in long distance running to highlight distance from healthcare providers as barriers to women receiving quality care.

Early life
Turlington was born in Oakland, California, the middle of three daughters born to Dwain Turlington, a pilot for Pan Am, and María Elizabeth (née Parker Infante), a flight attendant from El Salvador. She was raised in the Roman Catholic faith of her mother along with her sisters and continued to practice the religion into adulthood.

She was discovered by local photographer Dennie Cody while she was riding a horse in Miami, Florida, where her father was working as a training captain for Pan Am. Turlington began modeling after school from age 14 to 16 and during summers while she attended Monte Vista High School in Danville, California. After turning 18, she moved to New York City to model full-time, and later graduated from high school. She went back to school in 1994 and graduated cum laude in 1999 from the Gallatin School of Individualized Study of New York University, where she earned a Bachelor of Arts degree with a concentration in Comparative Religion and Eastern Philosophy. She continued her studies at the Columbia University Mailman School of Public Health.

Career

Modeling

20th century
During the 1990s, she appeared in Unzipped, a documentary about fashion designer Isaac Mizrahi, and the fashion mockumentary film Prêt-à-Porter by director Robert Altman. Additionally, she was featured in Catwalk, a documentary about her life on the fashion runways by director Robert Leacock. Turlington has appeared on international fashion magazines that include Vogue, Harper's Bazaar, Elle, Marie Claire, L'Officiel, Tatler, Glamour, Cosmopolitan and Allure.

Turlington has been featured in advertising campaigns for Calvin Klein, Chanel, Yves Saint Laurent, Marc Jacobs, Donna Karan, Prada, Valentino, Versace, Louis Vuitton, Bally, Jason Wu, Max Mara, Escada, Michael Kors, and Maybelline. She also appeared in two music videos. Fellow model Yasmin Le Bon got her husband Simon Le Bon of Duran Duran to feature Turlington in their "Notorious" video in 1986, at the age of 17. In 1990, singer George Michael drew inspiration from Peter Lindbergh's January 1990 British Vogue cover (which features Turlington, Campbell, Linda Evangelista, Cindy Crawford, and Tatjana Patitz) for his "Freedom!" video. The video featured all top 5 female models along with their top 5 male counterparts, lip-syncing the song. The video was shown during George Michael's 2008 concert tour while he sang. She was added on as the fourth model investor, after Elle Macpherson, Naomi Campbell and Claudia Schiffer of the now defunct Fashion Cafes.

21st century
In honor of Turlington's 40th birthday, W magazine put together a collection of notable images from her career, from runway shots from the late eighties to today. In 2008, casting agent James Scully said regarding Turlington:

Turlington was one of the faces to land in one of the fourteen covers of V magazine September 2008 issue. Each cover boasts a head shot of a famous model, either from the new crop of leading models or the supermodel era, it was lensed by duo Inez van Lamsweerde and Vinoodh Matadin.

She featured in the Bally spring/summer 2009 campaign alongside Oriol Elcacho.

Turlington Burns closed the Autumn Winter 2019 walk for fashion designer Marc Jacobs.

Other business ventures 
In the 2000s, she has become a partner in a variety of business ventures: an ayurvedic skincare line, Sundari, and two clothing lines produced by Puma, an active women's clothing line; and a women's yoga-wear line.

She has contributed writings to Marie Claire, Yoga Journal, and Teen Vogue along with contributions to the Huffington Post. She has also contributed to NBC’s Today Show as a guest correspondent, which included reporting on the status of girl’s education in Afghanistan in early 2002 and an interview with H.H. Dalai Lama at his home in Dharamshala, India.

She was also an initial product tester for the Apple Watch launch in 2015, participating in the press conference and allowing them to film a segment featuring her use of the Apple Watch to train for a marathon.

Humanitarian activities 

In 2005 Turlington began working with the international humanitarian organization CARE and has since become their Advocate for Maternal Health. She is also an Ambassador for Product Red.

After suffering complications in her own 2003 childbirth, and upon learning that over 500,000 women die each year during childbirth (of which 90% of the deaths are preventable), Turlington was inspired to pursue a Master's degree in Public Health at the Columbia University Mailman School of Public Health.

Turlington visited Swaziland in May 2007 on behalf of Product Red, and El Salvador and Peru in 2005 and 2008, respectively, on behalf of CARE. Her involvement with CARE was influenced by her mother, Elizabeth, who has been a longtime CARE supporter through her former flight attendants’ organization, World Wings. The FEMME project, a coming together of CARE, Columbia University, and local government, brings health-care practitioners together to find better methods of serving the large number of women needing assistance who are too intimidated to seek help in a clinic or traditional hospital.

In September 2010, Turlington participated in a CARE Learning Tour to Ethiopia to investigate the work being done to reduce maternal deaths.

Turlington currently serves on the Harvard Medical School Global Health Council, and as an advisor to the Harvard School of Public Health Board of Dean's Advisors, She is a member of White Ribbon Alliance for Safe Motherhood and Mother's Day Every Day.

An ex-smoker whose father died of lung cancer, Turlington is an anti-smoking activist.

No Woman, No Cry 
Turlington made her directorial debut on the 2010 documentary film No Woman, No Cry. The 60 minute documentary profiles the status of maternal health and focuses on four cases: from Tanzania, Bangladesh, Guatemala, and the United States. The film made its world premiere at the 2010 Tribeca Film Festival in the United States, and the U.S. television broadcast premiere aired on the new Oprah Winfrey Network (OWN) on May 7, 2011. The documentary earned Turlington a nomination for the Do Something With Style Award from the VH1 Do Something Awards.

Every Mother Counts 

Concurrent with the debut of her documentary No Woman, No Cry, Turlington launched Every Mother Counts (EMC), a non-profit 501(c)(3) organization dedicated to making pregnancy and childbirth safe for every mother. Every Mother Counts informs, engages, and mobilizes new audiences to take actions and raise funds that support maternal health programs around the world. EMC currently supports programs in Haiti, Uganda, Malawi, Indonesia, and the United States.

Turlington completed her first New York City Marathon in 2011, running with Team Every Mother Counts to raise awareness for maternal and child health. She also ran the 2013 ING NYC Marathon with Team EMC and 2013 Hood to Coast Relay, which is featured in her documentary film, Every Mile, Every Mother.

The charity released a short film series entitled Giving Birth in America some-time a little before May 2015.

Albums 
Every Mother Counts is a compilation album that was released in 2011 exclusively to Starbucks, with a proportion of the proceeds to be donated to CARE and the Every Mother Counts organisation to support its maternal health care programs in coffee growing countries worldwide.

Every Mother Counts 2012 is a compilation album that was released in 2012 in partnership with Starbucks. U.S. $8 from the sale of each CD in participating Starbucks stores during 2012 is "to be given in support of Every Mother Counts".

Other
In 2015, Turlington signed an open letter which the ONE Campaign had been collecting signatures for; the letter was addressed to Angela Merkel and Nkosazana Dlamini-Zuma, urging them to focus on women as they serve as the head of the G7 in Germany and the AU in South Africa respectively, which will start to set the priorities in development funding before a main UN summit in September 2015 that will establish new development goals for the generation.

Honours

She was one of fifteen women selected to appear on the cover of the September 2019 issue of British Vogue, by guest editor Meghan, Duchess of Sussex.

Personal life

In 2000, Turlington met actor, director, and writer Edward Burns at a Hamptons party, and by the end of the year they were engaged. In 2002 and just months after buying a New York property together, they decided to split up. The couple reunited and were married in June 2003. Despite numerous erroneous media reports, Turlington was not given away by her good friend Bono. Bono attended the San Francisco wedding, but Turlington said, "[Bono] was there, of course, but I gave myself away. I mean, I was 25 weeks pregnant at the time. Eddie met me halfway down the aisle." Burns and Turlington have two children, born in 2003 and 2006 respectively. Turlington's sister Kelly is married to Edward's brother Brian Burns.

Turlington began smoking at 13 and was smoking a pack a day by age 16. At age 26, she quit smoking. In 2000 at age 31, when undergoing a lung scan to raise awareness about current technology, she was diagnosed with early-stage emphysema.

Yoga
Turlington is a practitioner of yoga, specifically a type of yoga known as Jivamukti. Turlington has practiced yoga since 1987. Within an article published April 15, 2001, she stated she practiced three times a week, during the morning time. She credits yoga with bringing her closer to her Catholic faith.

She is the author of the book Living Yoga: Creating A Life Practice, first published in 2002, is now within a third edition (2002, 2003, 2005). The 2002 text has a foreword by Robert Thurman. Turlington was involved in the editing of the January–February 2001 edition of Yoga Journal.

Running
She has run four marathons during her life (through the end of 2021), including the London Marathon, her personal best is 3 hours and 46 minutes. Her first marathon was run during 2011 within New York City. Overall, she has completed three NYC Marathons to date in 2011, 2013, and 2021. Part of her training for the London Marathon, which she ran during 2015, was a half-marathon run, within Tanzania. She trained using the Apple Watch during 2015 (prior to the public release of the watch). Prior to her first marathon, Turlington was running distances of 3 to 5 miles a day, "a few times a week", a pattern of running typical for her for periods throughout her life.

References

Citations

Sources

External links

 
 
 
 Christy Turlington and Cedella Marley for Every Mother Counts
 Christy Turlington Burns  Video produced by Makers: Women Who Make America

1969 births
American people of Salvadoran descent
Hispanic and Latino American female models
New York University Gallatin School of Individualized Study alumni
People from the San Francisco Bay Area
Female models from California
American female models
People from Danville, California
Anti-smoking activists
Living people
American health activists
Columbia University Mailman School of Public Health alumni
Articles containing video clips
Catholics from California
21st-century American women